Radiance is a 1998 Australian independent film. It is the first feature film by Aboriginal director Rachel Perkins about three indigenous sisters who reunite for their mother's funeral. The film is based on the 1993 play written by Louis Nowra.

Cast 
 Rachael Maza as Cressy
 Deborah Mailman as Nona
 Trisha Morton-Thomas as Mae

Production
Rachel Perkins became aware of the play when she saw Trisha Morton-Thomas perform Mae's beach monologue as a part of the Eora College end-of-year student showcase. Perkins called Louis Nowra to adapt it into a half-hour drama, but Nowra suggested they make it as a feature film.

Awards 
Australian Film Institute
Best Performance by an Actress in a Leading Role: Deborah Mailman
Nominations:
Best Achievement in Direction, Best Achievement in Editing, Best Achievement in Production Design, Best Film, Best Screenplay Adapted from Another Source

Australian Screen Sound Guild
Best Achievement in Sound Design & FX Editing for a Feature Film

Canberra International Film Festival
Audience Award

Film Critics Circle of Australia Awards
Best Actor – Female: Deborah Mailman
Nomination: Best Screenplay – Adapted

Melbourne International Film Festival
Most Popular Feature Film

References

External links
 
Radiance at Oz Movies

1998 films
Australian independent films
1998 drama films
Australian drama films
Films set in Queensland
Films shot in Queensland
Films about Aboriginal Australians
Films directed by Rachel Perkins
1998 independent films
1990s English-language films
1990s Australian films